The Mexico national rugby union team (Spanish: Selección nacional de rugby Mexico) represents Mexico men's international rugby union competitions, they entered the World Rugby Rankings in March 2012, ranked initially in joint 71st place with other new entrants Pakistan and the Philippines.

Mexico is one of the newest members of World Rugby, having only been participating consistently in international rugby since the late 2000s; before, the 6 games, including 2 that are not capped by the FMR. Mexico also fields a rugby sevens team, as well as female teams in both the main union game and the 7s.

The national side is ranked 42nd in the world (as of August 2021).

History
Mexico played only four test matches before 2008. The National Team played Miami Rugby in November 1977. Mexico's first test match was in 1985, an 18–22 loss against the Cayman Islands. This match was followed by 2 games against Colombia in 1996 (a 46-12 victory and a 10-10 draw), and two losses in 2001 and 2002 against Cayman Islands.

2011 RWC qualifying

Mexico's first official test match, and first participation in Rugby World Cup qualifying, was in March 2008.  In that match, Mexico secured a 47-7 victory over Saint Vincent and the Grenadines in 2011 Rugby World Cup qualifying.  Mexico's record in qualifying was 2-2, finishing 6th place in Round 1A of the Americas qualification zone.

2015 RWC qualifying

A record crowd for a rugby match in Mexico saw the home team dispatch Jamaica 68–14 in Mexico City in front of more than 2,000 vociferous fans at the Universidad Iberoamericana. This match opened their NACRA Caribbean Championship account, and also doubled as the opening Rugby World Cup 2015 qualification match.
However, Mexico lost its next qualifying match 13–46 against the Cayman Islands, ending its 2015 Rugby World Cup qualifying campaign.

2019 RWC qualifying

Mexico played qualifying matches for the 2019 World Cup during 2016. They won all three of their first-round Americas North (North Zone) group stage games (against the Cayman Islands, Bermuda, and The Bahamas), and also won the first round final against South Zone winners, Guyana. As such, they were named champions of the 2016 Rugby Americas North Championship.

From here, they progressed to a one-off play-off game against the 2016 CONSUR "B" Rugby Championship, Colombia, which they lost 29-11, ending Mexico's qualifying campaign.

Rankings

Record by opponent

Updated to 11 December 2021.

Current squad

Mexico squad for the 2019 Rugby World Cup qualification match against Colombia.

See also
 Rugby union in Mexico
 Mexican Rugby Federation
 Mexico national rugby sevens team

References

External links
 Federación Mexicana de Rugby - Official Site
 Wallabies México Rugby Football Club - Official Site
 TEMPLARIOS México Rugby Football Club - Official Site

 
Rugby union in Mexico

fr:Rugby à XV au Mexique